Carnival Radiance (formerly Carnival Victory) is a  operated by Carnival Cruise Line. Ordered by Carnival in 1997, the  vessel was the third Destiny-class cruise ship to join the fleet after her debut in 2000 and became one of the largest cruise ships of her era. In 2021, she was renamed Carnival Radiance after a US$200 million refit was completed in October and she commenced service under her new name in December.

Construction
Carnival Victory  was built by Italian shipbuilder Fincantieri at its Monfalcone shipyard in Friuli-Venezia Giulia. She was launched on 31 December 1998 and later christened by Mary Frank, wife of Howard Frank, the then vice-chairman of Carnival. At the time of her launch, she was one of the largest cruise ships of her era.

In October 2018, Carnival announced that Carnival Victory would undergo a large-scale renovation in 2020 to complete the final phase of Carnival's fleet renovation program, after which the vessel would be renamed Carnival Radiance. The vessel was originally scheduled to begin the $200 million dry dock in Cádiz, Spain in March 2020 but the refit was postponed into the following year after the COVID-19 pandemic paused shipyard operations at the Navantia shipyard. The ship was officially renamed Carnival Radiance in September 2021 amid the continued renovation and left Cádiz in mid-October on a seven-week trip through the Panama Canal to reach her new homeport of Long Beach, California. In November, Carnival named Lucille O'Neal, mother of Carnival's brand ambassador, Shaquille O'Neal, as the ship's new godmother, and she christened the vessel on 12 December in Long Beach, after which the ship commenced operations the following day with a four-day inaugural sailing to Ensenada, Mexico and Catalina Island.

Design

Machinery
The ship is powered by four GMT Sulzer 16 ZAV and two GMT Sulzer 12 ZAV diesel-electric engines driving two controllable pitch propellers. She is fitted with two rudders (which can be individually controlled) as well as stabilizers.

Layout
Carnival Victory is themed by American designer and architect Joseph Farcus to depict the different oceans and seas of the world.

Like  (formerly Carnival Triumph), her architecture is different from sister ship  (formerly Carnival Destiny). The two newer vessels have additional balcony cabins on their Lido decks and various changes to placement and architecture of public areas. There are three large pools and a  waterslide.

She has a nine-deck atrium with four glass elevators, a two-deck lounge with seating for 747, and a total capacity of 3,400 passengers and 1,100 crew members.

Service history

Throughout her service, Carnival Victory was based in Miami, sailing year-round on alternating three-night and four-night cruises to Caribbean destinations. In July 2020, Carnival announced that Carnival Radiances new homeport would become Long Beach instead of Port Canaveral or Galveston, which were previously announced in 2018 and 2019, respectively. Following her debut in December 2021, she began sailing year-round on alternating three-night and four-night cruises to Catalina Island and Ensenada.

References

Notes

Bibliography

External links

 
 Carnival Victory Photo Gallery

Radiance
Ships built in Monfalcone
1998 ships
Ships built by Fincantieri